Prince Paley was a Russian noble title that was held by Prince Vladimir Pavlovich Paley (1897-1918). He was the son of Grand Duke Paul Alexandrovich of Russia and his morganatic second wife, Olga Valerianovna Karnovich, who was created Princess Paley in 1915 by Tsar Nicholas II of Russia. 

This title was allowed for use by all of the male agnates of Princess Olga (from her marriage with Grand Duke Paul Alexandrovich), but that ended up including only Prince Vladimir before the male line became extinct.

References 

1915 establishments in the Russian Empire
Noble titles created in 1915
1918 disestablishments in Russia
 
Lists of Russian nobility